State Route 115 (SR 115) is a primary state highway in the U.S. state of Virginia.  Known for most of its length as Plantation Road, the state highway runs  from U.S. Route 221 (US 221), US 460, and US 220 Alternate in Roanoke north to Interstate 81 (I-81) and US 220 near Hollins.

Route description

SR 115 begins at an intersection with Orange Avenue, which carries US 221, US 460, and US 220 Alternate, in the northeastern part of the city of Roanoke.  The state highway heads north as two-lane undivided Hollins Road between an industrial area that lines Norfolk Southern Railway's Roanoke District to the west and a residential area to the east.  SR 115 turns west onto Liberty Road to pass under the railroad, then turns north onto Plantation Road.  The state highway leaves the city of Roanoke and enters Roanoke County by crossing Carvin Creek, a tributary of Tinker Creek, south of its intersection with SR 625 (Hershberger Road), which becomes SR 101 to the west.  SR 115 continues through the community of Hollins, where the highway intersects US 11 (Lee Highway).  The state highway expands to a five-lane road with a center left-turn lane and passes through an industrial area on its way to its northern terminus at a diamond interchange with I-81 and US 220.  Immediately north of the interchange, Plantation Road continues as SR 815, which turns east to parallel the Interstate before turning north to its end at the dam that impounds Carvin Creek to form Carvin Cove Reservoir just north of the Roanoke–Botetourt county line.

Major intersections

References

External links

Virginia Highways Project: VA 115

115
State Route 115
State Route 115